Events from the year 1779 in Russia

Incumbents
 Monarch – Catherine II

Events

 Pavlograd founded, Lipetsk and Sergach granted town status.

Births

 2 February - Maria Naryshkina, mistress of Alexander I of Russia

Deaths

 13 April - Grigory Teplov, philosopher (born 1717)
 25 September - Ekaterina Chernysheva, courtier (born 1715)

References

1779 in Russia
Years of the 18th century in the Russian Empire